A diddle is a type of drum rudiment.

Diddle may also refer to:

People with the surname
 Edgar Diddle (1895–1970), American college men's basketball coach
W. H. Diddle

See also
 Diddl, a German cartoon character
 Hey Diddle Diddle (disambiguation)
 Diddler
 Lilting, form of traditional singing also known as diddling